In game theory, an outcome is a situation which results from a combination of player's strategies. Formally, a path through the game tree, or equivalently a terminal node of the game tree. A primary purpose of game theory is to determine the outcomes of games according to a solution concept (e.g. Nash equilibrium).

In a game where chance or a random event is involved, the outcome is not known from only the set of strategies, but is only realized when the random event(s) are realized.

A set of payoffs can be considered a set of N-tuples, where N is the number of players in the game, and the cardinality of the set is equal to the total number of possible outcomes when the strategies of the players are varied.  The payoff set can thus be partially ordered, where the partial ordering comes from the value of each entry in the N-tuple.  How players interact to allocate the payoffs among themselves is a fundamental aspect of economics.

Choosing among outcomes

Many different concepts exist to express how players might interact.  An optimal interaction may be one in which no player's payoff can be made greater, without making any other player's payoff lesser.  Such a payoff is described as Pareto efficient, and the set of such payoffs is called the Pareto frontier.

Many economists study the ways in which payoffs are in some sort of economic equilibrium.  One example of such an equilibrium is the Nash equilibrium, where each player plays a strategy such that their payoff is maximized given the strategy of the other players.

Players are persons who make logical economic decisions. It is assumed that human people make all of their economic decisions based only on the idea that they are irrational. A player's rewards (utilities, profits, income, or subjective advantages) are assumed to be maximised. The purpose of game-theoretic analysis, when applied to a rational approach, is to provide recommendations on how to make choices against other rational players. First, it reduces the possible outcomes; logical action is more predictable than irrational. Second, it provides a criterion for assessing an economic system's efficiency. 

In a Prisoner's Dilemma game between two players, player one and player two can choose the utilities that are the best response to maximise their outcomes. "A best response to a coplayer’s strategy is a strategy that yields the highest payoff against that particular strategy". A matrix is used to present the payoff of both players in the game. For example, the best response of player one is the highest payoff for player one’s move, and vice versa. For player one, they will pick the payoffs from the column strategies. For player two, they will choose their moves based on the two row strategies. Assuming both players do not know the opponents strategies. It is a a dominant strategy for the first player to choose a payoff of 5 rather than a payoff of 3 because strategy D is a better response than strategy C.

Applications

Equilibria are not always Pareto efficient, and a number of game theorists design ways to enforce Pareto efficient play, or play that satisfies some other sort of social optimality.  The theory of this is called implementation theory.  Other economists seek to design games based on a certain set of outcomes, an effort which goes under the name of mechanism design.

References

Game theory